Berdal is a surname. Notable people with the surname include:

Aanund Bjørnsson Berdal (1888–1981), Norwegian engineer
Ingrid Bolsø Berdal (born 1980), Norwegian actress
Mats Berdal (born 1965), Norwegian academic
Mimi Berdal (born 1959), Norwegian lawyer and businessman

See also
Bernal (disambiguation)